Gerald O'Grady Connor (15 September 1932 – 5 September 1993) was an Australian first-class cricketer who played for Western Australia and Tasmania. He was born and died in Perth, Western Australia.

References

1932 births
1993 deaths
Australian cricketers
Western Australia cricketers
Tasmania cricketers
Cricketers from Perth, Western Australia